Arachnophagy (/əˈræknɒfədʒi/, from Greek ἀράχνη aráchnē, 'spider', and φαγεῖν phagein, 'to eat') describes a feeding behaviour that includes arachnids. Aside from non-human creatures, the term can also refer to the practice of eating arachnids among humans.

In non-humans 

Arachnophagy is widespread among many animals, especially reptiles and birds. For example, arachnophagy is described among Philippine scops owls that feed on spider species such as Heteropoda venatoria.

In humans 

Like the human consumption of insects (anthropo-entomophagy), arachnids as well as myriapods also have a history of traditional consumption, either as food or medicine. Arachnids include spiders, scorpions and mites (incl. ticks) that are consumed by humans worldwide.

Fried spider, primarily tarantula species, is a regional snack in Cambodia. In Mexico, tarantula have been offered in tacos, with a splash of guacamole. However, Mexican law forbids the sale of many species of tarantula for human consumption, and vendors offering this delicacy have been shut down by authorities. In Venezuela, the Piaroa people have an history in eating the Goliath birdeater tarantula (Theraphosa blondi).

Fried scorpion is traditionally eaten in Shandong, China. Other countries include Vietnam and Thailand.

Milbenkäse is a German speciality cheese that is exposed to cheese mites during ripening, and on consumption often still has mites attached to the rind.

References 

Diets
Arachnids as food